Nikolai Vedehin (born 9 October 1985) is an Estonian athletics competitor.

He was born in Sillamäe.

He started his athletics exercising in 2001, coached by Jevgeni Terentjev. 2004-2013 his coach was Harry Lemberg.

He is multiple-times Estonian champion in different running disciplines.

Records: 
 800 m: 1.48,48 (2011)
 1000 m: 2.21,18 (2007)
 1500 m: 3.41,83 (2009)
 1 mile: 3.59,93 (2012)
 half marathon: 1:03.50 (2014)

References

Living people
1985 births
Estonian sportspeople